is a Japanese anime television series produced by MAPPA that is based on the Rage of Bahamut game. The anime aired between October 6, 2014, and December 29, 2014, for 12 episodes. The opening theme song "EXiSTENCE" is performed by SiM, while the ending theme song "Promised Land" is performed by Risa Shimizu. On May 6, 2015, a second season was announced at the series' orchestra concert event. Titled , it aired between April 7, 2017, and September 29, 2017. The second opening theme is "Walk This Way" by THE BEAT GARDEN, while the second ending theme is "Cinderella Step" by DAOKO.

Episode list

Season 1: Genesis

Season 2: Virgin Soul

References

Rage of Bahamut: Genesis